This article displays the rosters for the participating teams at the 2001 Tournament of the Americas played in Neuquén, Argentina from August 16 to August 26, 2001.

Group A

Canada

4 David Daniels
5 Sherman Hamilton
6 Dean Walker
7 Steve Nash
8 Shawn Swords
9 Prosper Karangwa
10 Jerome Robinson
11 Todd MacCulloch
12 Andrew Kwiatkowski
13 Peter Guarasci
14 Michael Meeks
15 Kevin Jobity
Head coach:  Jay Triano

Mexico

4 Omar López
5 Adam Parada
6 Florentino Chávez
7 David Crouse
8 Enrique González
9 Ramsés Benítez
10 Víctor Mariscal
11 Omar Quintero
12 Alonso Izaguirre
13 Luis Cuenca
14 Víctor Thomas
15 Edwin Sánchez
Head coach:  Jorge Ramírez

Panama

4 Danubio Bennett
5 Jair Peralta
6 Abdiel Mendieta
7 Maximiliano Gómez
8 Ricardo Yearwood
9 Alfonso Stoute
10 Leroy Jackson
11 Michael Hicks
12 Eric Cárdenas
13 Antonio García Murillo
14 Iván Jaén
15 Gonzalo Ortiz
Head coach:  Reggie Grenald

Puerto Rico

4 José Ortiz
5 Orlando Santiago
6 Carmelo Travieso
7 Carlos Arroyo
8 Jerome Mincy
9 Christian Dalmau
10 Elías Ayuso
11 Joe Murray
12 Rolando Hourruitiner
13 Sharif Fajardo
14 Richie Dalmau
15 Daniel Santiago
Head coach:  Julio Toro

Virgin Islands

Gracen Averil
Raja Bell
Leroy Blyden
Andy Chelcher
Jason Edwin
Jameel Heywood
Marcus Oliver
Ja Ja Richards
Oliver Taylor
Carl Thomas
Leon Trimmingham
Calvert White
Head coach:  Tevester Anderson

Group B

Argentina

4 Juan Ignacio Sánchez
5 Gabriel Fernández
6 Manu Ginóbili
7 Fabricio Oberto
8 Lucas Victoriano
9 Daniel Farabello
10 Hugo Sconochini
11 Luis Scola
12 Leonardo Gutiérrez
13 Andrés Nocioni
14 Leandro Palladino
15 Rubén Wolkowyski
Head coach:  Rubén Magnano

Brazil

4 Marcelinho Machado
5 Alex
6 Vanderlei
7 Tiagão
8 Sandro Varejão
9 Demétrius
10 Helinho
11 Estevam
12 Guilherme Giovannoni
13 Nenê
14 Anderson Varejão
15 Márcio Dornelles
Head coach:  Hélio Rubens Garcia

United States

4 Antonio Rambo
5 Marcus Banks
6 Blandon Ferguson
7 Reggie Griffin
8 Delonte Holland
9 Kendall Dartez
10 Seth Scott
11 Jerry Holman
12 Kenny Brown
13 J. K. Edwards
Head coach:  Dan Sparks
Assistant coaches: Wayne Baker, Jay Harrington, Bob Tipson

Uruguay

4 Juliano Rivera
5 Freddy Navarrete
6 Diego Losada
7 Diego Castrillón
8 Nicolás Mazzarino
9 Luis Arrosa
10 Marcelo Capalbo
11 Rodrigo Riera
12 Gustavo Szczygielski
13 Luis Silveira
14 Marcel Bouzout
15 Juan Manuel Moltedo
Head coach:  César Somma

Venezuela

4 Víctor David Díaz
5 Pablo Machado
6 Ernesto Mijares
7 Richard Lugo
8 Carlos Morris
9 Óscar Torres
10 Diego Guevara
11 Carl Herrera
12 Harold Keeling
13 Alexander Nelcha
14 Armando Becker
15 Omar Walcott
Head coach:  Jim Calvin

References

Bibliography

External links
2001 Championship of the Americas for Men at fiba.basketball
2001 squads at Latinbasket.com
2001 FIBA Americas Championship at usab.com
Síntesis: Torneo de las Américas Neuquén 2001 at argentina.basketball (in Spanish)

FIBA AmeriCup squads